Constantin Grecescu (7 January 1929 – 1996) was a Romanian long-distance runner. He competed in the marathon at the 1964 Summer Olympics.

References

1929 births
1996 deaths
Athletes (track and field) at the 1960 Summer Olympics
Athletes (track and field) at the 1964 Summer Olympics
Romanian male long-distance runners
Romanian male marathon runners
Olympic athletes of Romania
People from Dolj County
20th-century Romanian people